Dame Susan Nicola Bagshaw  (née Dean, born 30 September 1949) is a New Zealand doctor specialising in the health needs of young people.

Biography 
Bagshaw was born in Hong Kong on 30 September 1949. She grew up there and attended a Church of England girls' boarding school. Bagshaw studied at the University of London, where she obtained a BSc degree Cum Laude in Biochemistry in 1971 and subsequently an MB BS degree in 1974. She then moved to Christchurch, New Zealand in the early 1980s. She initially worked for the Family Planning Association to improve access to sexual and reproductive health services for young women by expanding the number of clinics in the South Island. However she found that young people were too embarrassed or shy to attend the clinics and instead she designed a "one-stop shop" model which provided a range of health services in one place.

In 1995, Bagshaw established a youth health centre in the central city area of Christchurch which offered free doctor's appointments, counselling and addiction support services for young people. The centre had to close in 2010 due to a lack of funding, but in 2012 Bagshaw opened a replacement youth hub in Barbadoes Street, which brought together 16 youth organisations into one facility.

Bagshaw is also a senior lecturer in paediatrics at the University of Otago in Christchurch and is the chair of the Korowai Youth Well-Being Trust and a trustee for the Collaborative for Research and Training in Youth Health and Development, which she founded. She also serves on the board of the Canterbury Charity Hospital Trust.

Recognition 
Bagshaw is Fellow of the Australasian Chapter of Sexual Health Medicine (FRACShM) of the Royal Australasian College of Physicians. She is also Fellow of the Royal New Zealand College of General Practitioners (FRNZCGP).

In the 2002 New Year Honours, Bagshaw was appointed a Companion of the New Zealand Order of Merit (CNZM), for services to youth health. In the 2019 Queen's Birthday Honours, she was promoted to Dame Companion of the same Order (DNZM), also for services to youth health.

Personal life 
Bagshaw is married to Phil Bagshaw, who she met at medical school in London. Together they have four children. In the 2019 New Year Honours, her husband was appointed a Companion of the New Zealand Order of Merit, for services to health. Her son Andrew, who lived in the United Kingdom, was killed in Ukraine in 2023 while doing voluntary humanitarian work during the Russo-Ukrainian War.

References

1949 births
Living people
Dames Companion of the New Zealand Order of Merit
Academic staff of the University of Otago
New Zealand general practitioners
Alumni of the University of London